McCaleb is a surname. Notable people with the surname include:

Chris McCaleb (born 1978), American film and television director, producer and editor
Ellen McCaleb, American woodworker and painter
Gary D. McCaleb (born 1941), American academic, politician and writer
Jed McCaleb, American computer programmer and entrepreneur 
Neal McCaleb (born 1935), American civil engineer and politician
Theodore Howard McCaleb (1810–1864), American judge

See also
McCalebb
Mount McCaleb